55 Cancri b (abbreviated 55 Cnc b), occasionally designated 55 Cancri Ab (to distinguish it from the star 55 Cancri B), also named Galileo, is an exoplanet orbiting the Sun-like star 55 Cancri A every 14.65 days. It is the second planet in order of distance from its star, and is an example of a hot Jupiter, or possibly rather "warm Jupiter".

In July 2014 the International Astronomical Union launched NameExoWorlds, a process for giving proper names to certain exoplanets and their host stars. The process involved public nomination and voting for the new names. In December 2015, the IAU announced the winning name was Galileo for this planet. The winning name was submitted by the Royal Netherlands Association for Meteorology and Astronomy of the Netherlands. It honors early-17th century astronomer and physicist Galileo Galilei.

Discovery

55 Cancri b was discovered in 1996 by Geoffrey Marcy and R. Paul Butler. It  was the fourth known extrasolar planet, excluding pulsar planets. It was discovered by detecting variations in its star's radial velocity caused by the planet's gravity. By making sensitive measurements of the Doppler shift of the spectrum of 55 Cancri A, a 15-day periodicity was detected. The planet was announced in 1996, together with the planet of Tau Boötis and the innermost planet of Upsilon Andromedae.

Even when this inner planet, with a mass at least 78% times that of Jupiter was accounted for, the star still showed a drift in its radial velocity. This eventually led to the discovery of the outer planet 55 Cancri d in 2002.

Orbit and mass
55 Cancri b is in a short-period orbit, though not so extreme as that of the previously detected hot Jupiter 51 Pegasi b. The orbital period indicates that the planet is located close to a 1:3 mean motion resonance with 55 Cancri c, however investigations of the planetary parameters in a Newtonian simulation indicate that while the orbital periods are close to this ratio, the planets are not actually in the resonance.

In 2012, b's upper atmosphere was observed transiting the star; so its inclination is about 85 degrees, coplanar with 55 Cancri e. This helped to constrain the mass of the planet but the inclination was too low to constrain its radius.

The mass is about 0.85 that of Jupiter.

Characteristics
55 Cancri b is a gas giant with no solid surface. The atmospheric transit has demonstrated hydrogen in the upper atmosphere.

That transit is so tangential, that properties such as its radius, density, and temperature are unknown. Assuming a composition similar to that of Jupiter and that its environment is close to chemical equilibrium, 55 Cancri b's upper atmosphere is predicted to be cloudless with a spectrum dominated by alkali metal absorption.

The atmosphere's transit indicates that it is slowly evaporating under the sun's heat. The evaporation is slower than that for previously studied (hotter) hot Jupiters.

The planet is unlikely to have large moons, since tidal forces would either eject them from orbit or destroy them on short timescales relative to the age of the system.

See also
 Appearance of extrasolar planets
 Cancer (Chinese astronomy)
 Lists of exoplanets
 Gliese 1132 b, Rocky exoplanet with a confirmed atmosphere.
 Mu Arae c, At constellation Ara
 Planetary system

References

External links
 

55 Cancri
Cancer (constellation)
Exoplanets discovered in 1996
Giant planets
Exoplanets detected by radial velocity
Transiting exoplanets
Exoplanets with proper names
Galileo Galilei
Hot Jupiters